1998 Dakar Rally, also known as the 1998 Paris–Granada–Dakar Rally, was the 20th running of the Dakar Rally event. The rally returned to a traditional Paris to Dakar route last used in 1993. A number of competitors were attacked near the end of the ninth stage, at Taoudenni in Mali. Jean-Pierre Fontenay won the car class and Stéphane Peterhansel won his sixth and final motorcycle title before switching to the car category for subsequent events. The truck title was won by Karel Loprais in a Tatra 815.

Stages

Stage results

Motorcycles

Cars

Trucks

Final standings

Motorcycles

Cars

Trucks

References

Dakar Rally
D
1998 in French motorsport
1998 in African sport